This is a list of non-profit radio stations.

References

Lists of radio stations in the United States